Schlytter is a surname. Notable people with the surname include:

Boye Schlytter (1891–1977), Norwegian businessman and mountain climber
Melvin H. Schlytter (1890–1959), American politician

See also
Schlatter